Perilipin 4, also known as S3-12, is a protein that in humans is encoded by the PLIN4 gene on chromosome 19. It is highly expressed in white adipose tissue, with lower expression in heart, skeletal muscle, and brown adipose tissue. PLIN4 coats lipid droplets in adipocytes to protect them from lipases. The PLIN4 gene may be associated with insulin resistance and obesity risk.

Structure

Gene  
The PLIN4 gene resides on chromosome 19 at the band 19p13.3 and contains 9 exons.

Protein  
This protein belongs to the perilipin family and contains 27 33-amino acid approximate tandem repeats. It is also one of the perilipin members of the PATS (PLIN, ADFP, TIP47, S3-12) family, which is named after structural proteins that share high amino acid sequence similarity and associate with lipid droplets. It shares a conserved C-terminal of 14 amino acid residues that folds into a hydrophobic cleft with other PATS members; however, it is missing the conserved N-terminal region of approximately 100 amino acid residues. Within the sequence of 33-amino acid repeats, PLIN4 contains a long stretch of imperfect 11-mer repeats predicted to form amphipathic helices with three helical turns per 11 amino acid residues. This 11-mer repeats tract is proposed to anchor the protein to the phospholipid monolayer of lipid droplets for its assembly, though no targeting sequence has yet been found in PLIN4.

Function 

PLIN4 is a member of the perilipin family, a group of proteins that coat lipid droplets in adipocytes, the adipose tissue cells that are responsible for storing fat. Perilipin acts as a protective coating from the body’s natural lipases, such as hormone-sensitive lipase, which break triglycerides into glycerol and free fatty acids for use in metabolism, a process called lipolysis. In humans, perilipin is expressed as 5 different isoforms; it is currently understood that the level of expression for each isoform is dependent on factors such as sex, body mass index, and level of endurance exercise.

PLIN4 is hyperphosphorylated by PKA following β-adrenergic receptor activation. Phosphorylated perilipin changes conformation, exposing the stored lipids to hormone-sensitive lipase-mediated lipolysis. Although PKA also phosphorylates hormone-sensitive lipase, which can increase its activity, the more than 50-fold increase in fat mobilization (triggered by epinephrine) is primarily due to perilipin phosphorylation.

Clinical significance 

The proteins in the Perilipin family are crucial regulators of lipid storage. PLIN4 expression is elevated in obese animals and humans. 

The PLIN4 gene, along with PLIN2, PLIN3, and PLIN5, have been associated with variance in body-weight regulation and may be a genetic influence on obesity risk in humans.

Interactions 

PLIN4 has been shown to interact with Caspase 8 and Ubiquitin C.

References

Further reading